Ronaldo Vidal Lucena Torrealba (born 27 February 1997) is a Venezuelan footballer who plays for Portuguesa as a midfielder.

International career
Lucena was called up to the Venezuela under-20 side for the 2017 FIFA U-20 World Cup.

Career statistics

Club

Notes

International

Honours

International
Venezuela U-20
FIFA U-20 World Cup: Runner-up 2017
South American Youth Football Championship: Third Place 2017

References

1997 births
Living people
Venezuelan footballers
Venezuela international footballers
Venezuelan expatriate footballers
Association football midfielders
Caracas FC players
Zamora FC players
Atlético Nacional footballers
Deportivo Táchira F.C. players
Jaguares de Córdoba footballers
Venezuelan Primera División players
Categoría Primera A players
Venezuelan expatriate sportspeople in Colombia
Expatriate footballers in Colombia
People from Acarigua
21st-century Venezuelan people